Chosen is the debut extended play by Italian rock band Måneskin. It was released on 8 December 2017 and peaked at number 3 on the Italian Albums Chart.

The EP includes the single with the same name and another original song ("Recovery"), both in English, and various cover songs performed during the eleventh season of X Factor Italia. The EP was certified platinum and in addition its tracks collected two platinum and four gold certifications by FIMI.

Outside Italy and post-Eurovision success, the band's rock cover of "Beggin'" by The Four Seasons became the most popular song from the record.

Track listing

Personnel 
Group
 Damiano David – vocals
 Victoria De Angelis – bass guitar
 Thomas Raggi – guitar
 Ethan Torchio – drums

Production and design
 Måneskin – production (tracks 1 and 2)
 Lucio Fabbri – production (tracks 3-7)
 Donato Romano – engineering (track 1)
 Antonio Baglio – mastering (track 1)
 Alessandro Marcantoni – recording (tracks 3-7)
 Pietro Caramelli, Claudio Giussani – mastering (tracks 3-7)
 Cirasa – artwork
 Riccardo Ambrosio – photography

Charts

Weekly charts

Year-end charts

Certifications

References

2017 debut EPs
Måneskin albums